Canawaugus (or Conawagus, or Ca-noh-wa-gas, or Conewaugus) was a Seneca Indian village.  The village was located on the west side of the Genesee River, "about a mile above the ford", on the eastern edge of the Town of Caledonia.  It was nearly opposite of the Avon sulphur springs. The name (translated as "Cattaraugus" in other Iroquoian languages) means "stinking waters" because of the sulphur.

Canawaugus was one of the most populous of the Seneca villages, with a population approaching 1000 people.

The Seneca religious leader Handsome Lake was born here about 1735. Governor Blacksnake moved here shortly after his birth.  Cornplanter was born here around 1750.

It is unclear whether or not the village was destroyed in the Sullivan Expedition of 1779. Canawaugus was one of the 11 reservations retained by the Seneca tribe in the Treaty of Big Tree in 1797. It sold the reservation to the Ogden Land Company in 1826. The Seneca Nation of Indians claims that the 1826 sale was never legal because it would have required a treaty be ratified by the United States Senate, and that the Canawaugus reservation was never disestablished.  The Ogden Land Company would later purchase the Senecas' remaining lands in the Second Treaty of Buffalo Creek in 1838, before returning the Allegany, Cattaraugus and Oil Spring reservations in the Third Treaty of Buffalo Creek in 1842.

In December 2022, the Seneca Nation of Indians purchased a  plot that had been on the Canawaugus reservation and claimed sovereignty over it as a continuation of the original Canawaugus reservation.

References

Iroquois populated places
Livingston County, New York
Native American history